Tsentralne ( Центральне) is a village in Mykolaiv Raion (district) of Mykolaiv Oblast (province) of southern Ukraine. In 2001, its population was 1,247 inhabitants. It belongs to Shevchenkove rural hromada, one of the hromadas of Ukraine. At present, elevation is 44m (144.35ft).

Until 18 July 2020, Tsentralne was located in Snihurivka Raion. The raion was abolished in July 2020 as part of the administrative reform of Ukraine, which reduced the number of raions of Mykolaiv Oblast to four. The area of Snihurivka Raion was merged into Bashtanka Raion, however, Tsentralne was transferred to Mykolaiv Raion.

2022 Russian Invasion of Ukraine 
During the 2022 Russian invasion of Ukraine, Tsentralne was captured by the Russian Armed Forces, but was subsequently liberated by the Armed Forces of Ukraine.

See also 
 Russian occupation of Mykolaiv Oblast
 Southern Ukraine campaign

References

Villages in Mykolaiv Raion, Mykolaiv Oblast
Populated places established in 1930
1930 establishments in Ukraine